Badi' al-Zaman Mirza (died 1514) was a Timurid ruler of Herat from 1506 to 1507. He was the son of Husayn Bayqarah, who was a great-great-grandson of Timur.

Biography
During the 1490s a conflict broke out between Badi' and his father. Husayn had transferred Badi' from his governorship in Astarabad, present day Gorgan, to Balkh, and then passed over Badi's son Muhammad Mu'min to replace him in Astarabad. Angry over this, Badi' launched a rebellion. He was defeated, and around the same time his son, who had been imprisoned in Herat, was executed. Husayn made peace with his son, but tension remained between the two, and in 1499 Badi' besieged Herat.

In 1506 Husayn died, and Badi' took the throne. However, he quickly became embroiled in a conflict with his brother Muzaffar Husain. In the midst of this, the Uzbeks under Muhammad Shaybani were threatening the realm. Babur, who had marched from Kabul in an effort to assist Husayn, arrived in Herat and stayed there for a while, but noted the weakness of the brothers and left without making battle with the Uzbeks. The next year, the Uzbeks captured Herat, bringing an end to Timurid rule there, and the brothers fled. Muzaffar died shortly after. Badi' went to Kandahar to muster forces and marched against the Uzbeks, but was defeated. He then came to the court of Ismail I of Persia, where he was given lands surrounding Tabriz and 3650 gold shorafins a year. He helped influence Ismail's decision to undertake an expedition against the Uzbeks in 1510. Badi' stayed seven years at Tabriz until it was conquered by Ottoman Sultan Selim I, at which point he travelled to Istanbul, where he died during the plague in 1514.

Family
Badi' al-Zaman had five consorts:
Urun Sultan Khanum, daughter of Sultan Abu Sa'id Mirza and Ruqaiya Sultan Begum, daughter of Ala al-Dawla Mirza bin Baysunghur bin Shah Rukh;
Kabuli Begum (div. 1507), daughter of Ulugh Beg Mirza II, married by Qambar Mirza Kukaltash in 1507;
Ruqaiya Agha, known as Andalib, a concubine, married by Timur Sultan Uzbeg, son of Muhammad Shaybani in 1507;
Chuchak Begum (m. 1498), daughter of Zun Nun Arghun, and sister of Shah Shuja and Muhammad Muqim;
A daughter of Tahamtan Beg, niece of Asad Beg, and mother of Muhammad Zaman Mirza;

Sons
Badi' al-Zaman had two sons:
Muhammad Mumin Mirza - with Urun Sultan Khanum;
Muhammad Zaman Mirza - with the daughter of Tahamtan Beg, married to Masuma Sultan Begum, daughter of Emperor Babur;

Daughter
Badi' al-Zaman had one daughter:
Chuchak Begum known as Kuchek Begum (died April 1507) - with Chuchak Begum;

Ancestry

References

Timurid monarchs
15th-century births
1514 deaths